Vasily Alekseyevich Sleptsov (July 31, 1836 – April 4, 1878), was a Russian writer, playwright, journalist and social reformer.

Biography
Sleptsov was born in Voronezh into a noble family. His father Alexey Vasilyevich was a military man, mother Josefina Adamovna,  née Welbutovich-Paplonska, belonged to the Polish szlachta. He studied at the First Moscow Gymnasium and later, when the family moved to their county estate in Saratov Governorate, at the Penza Institute for Nobility. Sleptsov attended the medical school at Moscow University in 1855-56. He then went to Yaroslavl to try being an actor. He soon returned to Moscow, where he was in government service from 1857 to 1861-62.

In the early 1860s Sleptsov organized a women's commune in Saint Petersburg, and set up a society for female translators. He wrote fiction for several magazines including Otechestvennye Zapiski, Russkaya Rech, and Sovremennik, where he published his novel Hard Times in 1865. Sleptsov's works were praised by Leo Tolstoy; especially his story "The Ward" (1863).

In 1866 he was arrested for political activities, and for his association with Dmitry Karakozov, a man who had attempted to assassinate Tsar Alexander II. Upon his release, he helped to found the magazine The Women's Herald. His works were widely read in the 1860s, but his popularity began to decline in the 1870s. The novel A Good Man was left unfinished at his death in 1878.

English translations 
"Choir Practice", (story), from The Humor of Russia, Ethel Voynich/Sergey Stepnyak-Kravchinsky, Walter Scott Publishing, 1909. from Archive.org
"The Ward", (story), from In the Depths, Raduga Publishers, Moscow, 1987.
 Hard Times: A Novel of Liberals and Radicals in 1860s Russia, transl. by M. R. Katz ; with an introduction by W. C. Brumfield. University of Pittsburgh Press, 2016

References

Bibliography
 .
 .
 .

1836 births
1878 deaths
Writers from Voronezh
People from Voronezh Governorate
Russian male novelists
Russian male short story writers
Russian publishers (people)
Russian prisoners and detainees
Social reformers
19th-century novelists from the Russian Empire
19th-century short story writers from the Russian Empire
19th-century male writers from the Russian Empire
Moscow State University alumni